King's Mill or Vincent's Mill, Shipley, West Sussex, England, is a smock mill built in 1879.

History

King's Mill was built in 1879 for Friend Martin at a cost of £2,500 by Messrs Grist and Steele, millwrights of Horsham. Machinery from a windmill at Coldwaltham is believed to have been incorporated in the mill. Martin operated the windmill and the village shop until he died in 1884. The mill failed to sell so his wife hired Robert Miller as miller on her behalf. In 1895 it was sold to Richard Vincent who hired Ernest Powell as miller. The writer Hilaire Belloc bought the mill and the surrounding land in 1906.  Powell continued to be miller while the mill worked commercially until 1926, latterly by a steam engine. After the death of Belloc in 1953, King's Mill was restored by E. Hole and Sons, the Burgess Hill millwrights, as a memorial to the writer, and was re-opened to visitors for the first time in 1958. West Sussex County Council had responsibility for the upkeep of the mill which remained in the ownership of the Belloc family. A local committee the Friends of Shipley Windmill opened the mill to visitors until 1986. Major repairs to the mill were required and County Council agreed with the owners to form a charitable trust to manage the mill.

The Shipley Windmill Charitable Trust was formed in 1987 and took over responsibility for the repairs and maintenance. Further restoration work was carried out by Hole's between 1987 and 1990, when the mill re-opened, although with only two sweeps at that time. The second pair of sweeps was fitted in 1991. A new stock was fitted in November 2004. On 7 April 2009, it was announced that the mill was to close to the public as the lease owned by Shipley Mill Charitable Trust only had three years to run and the building needed £80,000 worth of repairs. They had been notified that the lease would not be renewed when it expired. The mill opened for the 2009 season on 5 April and held its last open day on 19 July. The owners fitted two new pairs of sweeps and a further new stock on 21 June 2013. In 2021, a planning application to convert the engine house to residential use was rejected by Horsham District Council.

Description

King's Mill is a four-storey smock mill on a two-storey brick base. It has four patent sails carried on a cast-iron windshaft. The octagonal conical cap is winded by a fantail. The brake wheel is wood, driving a cast-iron wallower on an oak upright shaft. This carries a cast-iron great spur wheel which drives three pairs of overdrift millstones.

The mill is Grade II* listed.

Millers

1879-1884 Friend Martin
1884-1895 Robert Wood
1895-1926 Ernest Powell

Sources:

Culture and media
In the BBC television series Jonathan Creek, the mill was the filming location for Creek's home.

References

Further reading
 Online version

External links

Shipley Windmill
 

Windmills in West Sussex
Horsham District
Smock mills in England
Windmills completed in 1879
Monuments and memorials in West Sussex
Octagonal buildings in the United Kingdom
Grade II* listed buildings in West Sussex